Motive for Murder is a 1957 British television drama. The six-part thriller serial was produced by ATV and aired on ITV. The half-hour series was written by Jimmy Sangster. Cast included Vincent Ball, Gene Anderson, Geoffrey Chater, and Victor Brooks. Unlike many British television series of the era, it still exists in the archives.

Premise
A man sets out to clear himself of murder by finding the real murderer.

See also
Five Names for Johnny
The Gentle Killers
The Man Who Finally Died
The Voodoo Factor

References

External links
 Motive for Murder at IMDb

1957 British television series debuts
1957 British television series endings
1950s British drama television series
Black-and-white British television shows
English-language television shows
ITV television dramas
Television series by ITV Studios
1950s British television miniseries
1950s British crime television series